The Olympus Zuiko Digital ED 8mm f/3.5 Fisheye is an interchangeable "full-frame" or diagonal fisheye lens for Four Thirds system digital single-lens reflex cameras, announced by Olympus Corporation on June 30, 2005.

References

External links

 

008mm f 3.5 Fisheye ED
Camera lenses introduced in 2005